The Furness Railway Company owned many different types of locomotives, built by several locomotive building companies, including Sharp Stewart and Company. Others were built by the Furness' constituent companies - the Whitehaven and Furness Junction Railway, among others.

Furness Railway locomotives

The classes listed below are not the official FR designations; they were made popular by author Bob Rush in his books about the Furness Railway.

Cleator & Workington Junction Railway

The Furness railway entered into a working agreement with the Cleator & Workington Junction Railway where the FR would work the companies mainlines and the branch lines were worked by C&WJR engines. The loco list previously shown on this page has been amended thus:

Cleator & Workington Junction Railway locomotives

All the nameplates used on this company's locomotives were named after residences of C&WJR company directors. Until recently there was uncertainty about the name of No. 2 but the personal notebook of the Company Accountant shows otherwise. The engine never ran in service with the name  "Ennerdale" .

 No. 1  Brigham Hill (1st) and Rothersyke (1st) 
An outside cylinder 0-4-0T Built in 1894 by Fletcher Jennings Ltd for C&WJR. Builders No. 187. Nameplates carried: Brigham Hill (1882–1894) and Rothersyke (1894–1897)  Renumbered: No known renumbering of this engine.  Disposal: To West Stanley Colliery Coy. County Durham in 1897
 No. 2  Unnamed for fifteen years, then Rothersyke (2nd) 
An outside cylinder 0-4-0ST. Built circa 1875 by Barclay & Co. (not an Andrew Barclay Sons & Co. product). Built originally for Ward, Ross & Liddlelow, railway contractors to the C&WJR, No.2 was purchased second hand in 1882. No. 2 was originally named Ennerdale but the nameplates were removed after acquisition by the C&WJR on the order of the Managing Director. Nameplates Carried: None from 1882 to 1897. The redundant plates from engine No.1 Rothersyke were fitted when it was decided to sell the engine.  Renumbered: No known renumbering of this engine.  Disposal: To SD Coasdell of Workington in July 1898 for £150.
 No. 3  South Lodge 
An outside cylinder 0-6-0ST of 1884, built by Robert Stephenson and Company for the C&WJR. Builders No. 2553. The saddle tank did not cover the smokebox. Nameplates carried: South Lodge. (1884 to 1920)  Renumbered: No known renumbering of this engine.  Disposal: To J.F. Wake Ltd., Dealers, Darlington, County Durham, July 1920
 No. 4  Harecroft 
An outside cylinder 0-6-0ST built in 1885 by the Lowca Engineering Co. Ltd. for the C&WJR. Builders No. 196. Similar in appearance to No.3 and the saddle tank did not cover the smokebox. Nameplates carried:  Harecroft. (1885 to 1915)  Renumbered: After disposal by new owner to 46 Disposal: Withdrawn September 1915 and sold to Workington Iron & Steel Company.
 No. 5  Moresby Hall  
An outside cylinder 0-6-0ST built in 1890 by Robert Stephenson and Company for the C&WJR. Builders No. 2692. The saddle tank did not cover the smokebox.Nameplates carried:  Moresby Hall . (1890 to 1919)  Renumbered: No known renumbering of this engine.  Disposal: Withdrawn and scrapped 1919.
 No. 6  Brigham Hall  
An outside cylinder 0-6-0ST built in 1894 by Robert Stephenson and Company for the C&WJR. Builders No. 2813. The saddle tank did not cover the smokebox.Nameplates carried:  Brigham Hall . (1894 to 1920)  Renumbered: Allocated 11564 by the LMS in 1923 after the grouping, but not known if it was repainted into LMS colours. Disposal: Withdrawn 11/12/1926 and scrapped by the LM&SR
 No. 7  Ponsonby Hall  
An outside cylinder 0-6-0ST built in 1896 by Robert Stephenson and Company for the C&WJR. Builders No. 2846. The saddle tank did not cover the smokebox.Nameplates carried:  Ponsonby Hall . (1886 to 1926)  Renumbered: Allocated 11565 by the LMS in 1923 after the grouping, but not known if it was repainted into LMS colours. Disposal: Withdrawn 18/12/1926 and scrapped by the LM&SR
 No. 8  Hutton Hall  
An 0-6-0ST built in 1907 by Peckett and Sons for the C&WJR. Builders No. 1134. Nameplates carried:  Hutton Hall  (1907 to 1927)  Renumbered: Allocated 11566 by the LMS in 1923 after the grouping, and repainted into early LMS black goods livery. Disposal: Withdrawn 3/12/1927 and scrapped by the LM&SR
 No. 9 Millgrove  
An outside cylinder 0-6-0ST built in 1919 by Peckett and Sons for the C&WJR. Builders No. 1340. Nameplates carried:  Millgrove (1919 to 1928)  Renumbered: Allocated 11567 by the LMS in 1923 after the grouping, and repainted into early LMS black goods livery. Disposal: Withdrawn 5/12/1928 and scrapped by the LM&SR
 No. 10 Skiddaw Lodge  
An outside cylinder 0-6-0ST built in 1920 by Hudswell Clarke & Co. for the C&WJR. Builders No. 1400. Nameplates carried:  Skiddaw Lodge . (1920 to 1932)  Renumbered: Allocated 11568 by the LMS in 1923 after the grouping, and repainted into early LMS black goods livery.   Disposal: Withdrawn 1932 by LM&SR and sold to Hartley main Collieries Northumberland, via Robert frazer & Sons Ltd., Hebburn, County Durham.

Preserved locomotives

Three very early Furness Railway locomotives have been preserved:

 Furness Railway No. 3 – "Old Coppernob" 0-4-0 tender engine of 1846, preserved at the National Railway Museum in York.
 Furness Railway No. 20 – Sharp Stewart Class A5 0-4-0 tender engine of 1863, now at Ribble Steam Railway in Lancashire.  This is Britain's oldest working standard-gauge steam locomotive.  It had been converted to a saddle-tank locomotive, but has now been restored to its original tender locomotive design.
 Furness Railway No. 25 – Sharp Stewart Class A5 0-4-0 tender engine of 1865, now at Ribble Steam Railway awaiting restoration. Unlike No. 20 (above), this locomotive remains in its later saddle-tank format.
 Furness Railway No. 115 – Sharp Stewart Class D1 0-6-0 tender locomotive of 1881. The locomotive was lost when a mine working collapsed at Lindal-in-Furness on 22 September 1892; only the tender was rescued, which was then used on a loco to replace 115. The locomotive remains buried 200 ft underground, but is technically still in existence.

References

External links

Steam Index's Furness Railway Page

Furness Railway
 
Furness Railway